Căpriana is a village in Strășeni District, Moldova.

Căpriana monastery is a popular tourist destination, a wedding venue, and a religious centre.

References

Villages of Strășeni District